Mary Esther may refer to the following:

Places
Mary Esther, Florida

People
Mary Esther Gaulden Jagger (1921–2007), American radiation geneticist and political activist
Mary Esther Harding (1888–1971), British-American Jungian analyst
Mary Esther Kropp Dakubu (1938–2016), American linguist based in Ghana
Mary Esther MacGregor (1872–1961), Canadian author also known as Marian Keith
Mary Esther Trueblood (1872–1939), American mathematician and sociologist
Mary Esther Wells (1943–1992), American singer
Mary Esther Were, Kenyan beauty pageant titleholder